Val de Louyre et Caudeau is a commune in the department of Dordogne, southwestern France. It was established on 1 January 2017 by the merger of the former communes of Cendrieux and Sainte-Alvère-Saint-Laurent Les Bâtons. Sainte-Alvère-Saint-Laurent Les Bâtons was the result of the merger of the communes of Sainte-Alvère and Saint-Laurent-des-Bâtons on 1 January 2016.

See also 
Communes of the Dordogne department

References 

Communes of Dordogne